Fowler is an unincorporated community and census-designated place in Gilmer Township, Adams County, Illinois, United States and is located near Quincy. It is part of the Quincy, IL–MO Micropolitan Statistical Area. U.S. Route 24 passes through the center of town as well as the Burlington Northern and Santa Fe Railroad. Interstate 172 begins two miles west of Fowler.

Fowler had its start in the 1850s when the railroad was extended to that point. A post office called Fowler's Station was established in 1857, and the name was changed to Fowler in 1869.

Geography 

Demographics
As of the 2020 census there were 154 people, 44 households, and 18 families residing in the CDP. The racial makeup of the CDP was 87.01% White, 0.65% Native American, 1.95% Asian, 1.30% from other races, and 9.09% from two or more races. Hispanic or Latino of any race were 5.84% of the population.

References

Unincorporated communities in Adams County, Illinois
Quincy, Illinois micropolitan area
Unincorporated communities in Illinois